"Orion" is Mika Nakashima's 27th single, released on November 12, 2008. It was the insert song for the Japanese TBS drama, Ryūsei no Kizuna, in which Mika co-starred. The "B-side" song, "FOCUS", was used for the television commercial of the Canon IXY Digital 920 IS camera. Orion, a lite rock-influenced ballad, has sold over 1.300.000 digital downloads.

The single is certified Gold by RIAJ for shipment for 100,000 copies and Million for digital downloads.

Track listing

Charts

Oricon sales chart (Japan)

References

External links
 http://www.mikanakashima.com/
 http://www.kumonoito.net/

2008 singles
Mika Nakashima songs
2008 songs